The Our Lady of the Assumption Co-Cathedral  also called Baracoa Cathedral is a religious building affiliated with the Catholic Church which is located in the town of Baracoa on the island and Caribbean nation of Cuba.

The present church has its origins in the church built in 1807 during the Spanish colonization of Cuba, was partially damaged in 1833 and was renovated almost entirely in 1886. The portico was completed in 1905. By the early twenty-first century the church had deteriorated considerably but it was renovated and restored again in works that ended in 2012.

Follow the Roman or Latin rite and with the St. Catherine of  Ricci Cathedral in Guantánamo is the main church of the diocese of Guantánamo-Baracoa (Dioecesis Guantanamensis-Baracoensis) created by Pope John Paul II in 1998.

See also
Roman Catholicism in Cuba
Our Lady of the Assumption Co-Cathedral, Opava

References

Roman Catholic cathedrals in Cuba
Baracoa
Roman Catholic churches completed in 1807
19th-century Roman Catholic church buildings in Cuba